Joseph Lafayette Rhinock (January 4, 1863 – September 20, 1926) was a U.S. Representative from Kentucky, businessman and mayor. Born in Owenton, Kentucky, Rhinock moved during his childhood to Covington, Kentucky, attending public school there.

Biography 
Initially, Rhinock entered the oil refinery industry, and served as president of the Covington Public Library Board two terms. After this, he served as member of the Covington city council, going on to serve as mayor between 1893 and 1900.

Rhinock was elected as a Democrat to the 59th, 60th, and 61st Congresses (serving between March 4, 1905 and March 3, 1911), but was not a candidate for renomination in 1910.

For 22 years, Rhinock was connected with theater in New York City and Cincinnati, Ohio, serving as vice president, secretary, and treasurer of the Shubert Organization theater company. He served as vice president of the Loews Theater. Rhinock later became actively interested in horse racing and racetrack corporations.

Rhinock died at his home in the Bonnie Crest neighborhood of New Rochelle in Westchester County, New York, on September 20, 1926, aged 63. He was interred in Highland Cemetery, Covington.

References

External links

 

1863 births
1926 deaths
Politicians from New Rochelle, New York
Democratic Party members of the United States House of Representatives from Kentucky
Mayors of places in Kentucky
Politicians from Covington, Kentucky